The following list is the discography of the American soul musician Solomon Burke.

Studio albums
Solomon Burke – 1962 (Apollo 498) Reissued 1964 (Kenwood KLP-498) Reissued 2000 (P-Vine)
Solomon Burke's Greatest Hits – 1962 (Atlantic 8067)
If You Need Me – 1963 (Atlantic 8085)
I Almost Lost My Mind – 1964 (Clarion 607)
Rock 'n' Soul – 1964 (Atlantic 8096)
The Best of Solomon Burke – 1965 (Atlantic 8109) #6 R&B, #141 Pop
King Solomon – 1968 (Atlantic 8158)
I Wish I Knew – 1968 (Atlantic 8185)
Proud Mary – 1969 (Bell 6033) #140 Pop, chart run – 4 weeks
The Electronic Magnetism (also known as King Heavy) – 1971 (MGM 4767)
Cool Breeze [soundtrack] – 1972 (MGM, 1 SE 35 ST)
We're Almost Home – 1972 (MGM 4830)
History of Solomon Burke – 1972 (Pride 0011)
I Have a Dream – 1974 (ABC/Dunhill ABC 50161)
Music to Make Love By – 1975 (Chess 60042) #54 Soul, chart run – 6 weeks
Back to My Roots – 1976 (Chess 19002)
Sidewalks, Fences and Walls – 1979 (Infinity 9024)
From The Heart – 1981 (Charly R&B CRB 1024)
Lord, I Need a Miracle Right Now – 1981 (Savoy 14660)
Into My Life You Came – 1982 (Savoy 14679)
Take Me, Shake Me – 1983 (Savoy 14717)
This Is His Song – 1984 (Savoy 14738)
Soul Alive! – 1984 (Rounder 2042/2043)
A Change Is Gonna Come – 1986 (Rounder 2053)
Love Trap – 1987 (Royalty-Gate MCI Records/Isis-Voice 21336)
Homeland – 1991 (Bizarre/Straight 70558)
Soul of the Blues – 1993 (Black Top 1095)
Live at the House of the Blues – 1994 (Black Top 1108)
The Definition of Soul – 1997 (Pointblank 42557)
Not by Water But Fire This Time – 1999 (GTR 0237)
Christmas All Over the World – 1999 (One)
The Commitment – 2001 (GTROC7994251SB, Canada)
Don't Give Up on Me – 2002 (ANTI-/Fat Possum 80358)
Make Do With What You Got – 2005 (Shout! Factory, DK 34357)
Nashville – 2006 (Shout! Factory 826663-10179)
Like a Fire – 2008 (Shout! Factory 826663-10846)
Nothing's Impossible – 2010 (E1, E1E-CD-2086)
Hold On Tight (with De Dijk) – 2010 (Universal Music)

Compilations
The King of Soul – 1980 LP (Charly 1024) Reissued – 1995 (Charly 8014)
Cry To Me – 1984 LP (Charly 1075)
You Can Run, But You Can't Hide – 1987 (Mr. R&B, RBD-108)
Bishop Rides South – 1988 (Charly 1187)
Best of Solomon Burke – 1991 (Curb 77422)
Home in Your Heart: The Best of Solomon Burke – 1992 (Rhino/Atlantic 70284)
Let Your Love Flow – 1993 (Shanachie 9202)
Solomon Burke's Greatest Hits – 1997 (Sequel 859) = Reissue of Atlantic 8067
If You Need Me – 1997 (Sequel 860) = Reissue of Atlantic 8075
Rock 'N Soul – 1997 (Sequel 861) = Reissue of Atlantic 8096
King Solomon – 1997 (Sequel 862) = Reissue of Atlantic 8158
I Wish I Knew – 1997 (Sequel 863) = Reissue of Atlantic 8185
We Need a Miracle – 1998 (Malaco 501 3116)
The Very Best of Solomon Burke – 1998 (Rhino/Atlantic 72972)
King of Rock 'N' Soul – 1998 (Black Top 7006)
If You Need Me/Rock 'N Soul – 1998 (Collectables 6225) = Reissue of Atlantic 8075 and 8096
King Solomon/I Wish I Knew – 1999 (Koch 8016) = Reissue of Atlantic 8158 and 8185
Proud Mary: The Bell Sessions – 2000 (Sundazed, SC 11079)
The Collection – 2004 (Spectrum)
That's Heavy Baby: The Best of the MGM Years 1971–1973 – 2005 (Raven)
The Chess Collection – 2006 (Chess/Universal)
This Is It: Apollo Soul Origins – 2008 (Shout! 46)
No Man Walks Alone 1955–1957 – 2008 (Saga)
Looking for a Sign: The Complete ABC & Pride Recordings 1972–74 – 2009 (Shambala)

Live albums
Live in Nashville (Snapper) – 2007 – DVD
The Last Great Concert, Switzerland 2008 – 2012 (Floating World Records)
Live at Montreux 2006  – 2013 (Eagle Records)

Singles

Contributions
Jackpot of Hits (Apollo 490) Various Artists – 1959 – "Just Walking In A Dream" and "You Can Run But You Can't Hide"
Blues Before Sunrise starring Ray Charles and Solomon Burke (Grand Prix 406) – 1964 – "Friendship Ring", "Mama, Mama Dear", and "Leave My Kitten Alone";
Soul Clan (ATCO) Soul Clan – 1969 – "Just Out of Reach (Of My Open Arms)" Reissue: 2009
Gospel at Christmas (Hob 3525) Various Artists – 1993 – "Let's Keep the Christ in Christmas"
Soul Christmas (Atlantic/ WEA) Various Artists – 1994 – "Christmas Presents"
Till the Night is Gone: A Tribute to Doc Pomus (Rhino 71878) Various Artists – 1995 – "Still in Love"
I'll Always Love My Mama (AMW) Various Artists – 1999 – "Mother Loves Her Children All the Same"
At the Club (Kent) Various Artists – 1999 – "Keep Lookin'"
The Beat Goes On...Atlantic's Dance Through The 50s, 60s & 70s (CD Kent 191 UK) – 2000 – "Maggie's Farm"
Sanctified Soul (Kent) – 2000 – "He'll Have To Go" and "That's How it Feels" (The Soul Clan)
Ultimate Dirty Dancing (RCA Victor Europe) Various Artists – 2000 – "Cry to Me" reissued 2006 (Sony BMG)
Joyful Noise – Derek Trucks Band – 2002 – "Home In Your Heart" and "Like Anyone Else"
Lifted: Songs of the Spirit – 2002 – "None of Us Are Free"
The Heart and Soul of Bert Berns (Umvd Labels) Various Artists – 2002 – "Everybody Needs Somebody to Love"
ZU & Co. – Zucchero – 2004 – "Diavolo in Me / Devil in Me"
Jack O the Green – Jools Holland – 2005 – "Message to My Son" with Eric Clapton
Atlantic Top 60: Sweat-Soaked Soul Classics (Rhino Atlantic) Various Artists – 2007 – "Cry To Me (Single/LP Version)", "Everybody Needs Somebody To Love", "Got To Get You Off My Mind (LP Version)", "If You Need Me (Single/LP Version)", "Just Out Of Reach [Of My Two Empty Arms]", and "Soul Meeting' (LP version) – The Soul Clan
Brussel – De Dijk – 2008 – "Het Moet En Het Zal/Enough Is Enough"
The Bert Berns Story Volume 1: Twist & Shout 1960–1964 (Ace Records UK) Various Artists – 2008 – "Cry to Me"
The Bert Berns Story – Mr Success Volume 2: 1964–1967 (Ace Records UK) Various Artists – 2009 – "Everybody Needs Somebody to Love"
Only in America: Atlantic Soul Classics – (Rhino Atlantic) – 2009 – "Stupidity", "If You Need Me", "Everybody Needs Somebody to Love", "Keep Looking", "Maggie's Farm", "That's How it Feels" (as part of The Soul Clan)
How Many Roads – Black America Sings Bob Dylan (Ace Records UK) Various Artists – 2010 – "Maggie's Farm"

References

External links

Discographies of American artists
Rhythm and blues discographies